Amaury de Clisson (1304–1347), was a Breton knight who became the chief emissary for Jeanne de Penthièvre to the court of Edward III of England. He was also the brother of Olivier IV de Clisson who became embroiled in the intrigue of the Siege of Vannes and was subsequently executed by the King of France for perceived treason.

Marriage
Amaury married Isabeau de Ramefort, Dame of Ramefort and Mortiercrolles, probably celebrated in Angers in 1333. They had three children:
 Amaury II, who died with no issue;
 Isabeau, who after the death of her brother, married in 1354 to Renaud d'Ancenis. By 8 March 1383, Isabeau had lost her husband;  and
 Mahaut, who married Guy de Bauçay.

During the Breton War of Succession
During the Breton War of Succession, de Clisson sided with the English choice for the empty Breton ducal crown, John de Montfort, against the French preference, Charles de Blois. His brother, Olivier IV did not support this view. As a result of his prominence in the Montfortist camp, his lands in France were confiscated in October 1344 and given to William the Binder.

Emissary to England
De Clisson concluded an agreement on behalf of the Montfortists on 10 March 1342, in Westminster with Edward III of England and returned to Brittany with 6,000 archers saving the de Montforts who at this stage were besieged at the port city of Hennebont.

Defender of Hennebont
De Clisson remained the main Breton commander at Hennebont against the Franco-Breton siege of the city. Chroniclers, state that two captured Breton knights were to be killed by Luis de la Cerda at the base of the city's rampart. The Anglo-Breton defenders apparently had spies in Franco-Breton camp and became aware of the situation, resolving to try everything to snatch them back. While de Clisson simulated a distraction to attract the attention of the besiegers, the English co-commander Walter de Mauny diverted around the walls and recaptured the two knights returning with them.

Battle of La Roche-Derrien
De Clisson was involved and apparently killed in the Battle of La Roche-Derrien which was fought on 20 June 1347 during the night between Anglo-Breton and Franco-Breton forces. Approximately 4,000–5,000 French, Breton and Genoese mercenaries laid siege to the town of La Roche-Derrien in the hope of luring the Anglo-Bretons into an open pitched battle.

See also 
 Jean de Beaumanoir, opposing co-commander in the army of Charles de Blois.
 Joan, Duchess of Brittany, also known as Jeanne de Penthièvre.
 John IV, Duke of Brittany, husband of Jeanne de Penthièvre.
 Philip VI of France

References 

1304 births
1347 deaths
14th-century Breton people
People from Loire-Atlantique
People of the Hundred Years' War